Isaac Nader (born 17 August 1999 in Faro) is a Portuguese middle-distance runner.

Twice 2021 National indoor champion on 1500 and 3000 m he detains the following records:
800 m:	1:47.93	at Lisbon University Stadium (POR), on 1 August 2020;
1500 m:	3:37.15	at	Polideportivo Municipal, Andújar (ESP), on 22 May 2021;
3000 m:	8:01.66	in Faro (POR), on 11 May 2019.

He won the 3000 m at the 2021 European Athletics Team Championships in Chorzów.

References

External links
IAAF profile

1999 births
Living people
People from Faro, Portugal
Portuguese male middle-distance runners
S.L. Benfica athletes
Sportspeople from Faro District
World Athletics Championships athletes for Portugal